Call Me Kat is an American television sitcom largely based on the British sitcom Miranda by Miranda Hart. The series is written by Darlene Hunt and stars Mayim Bialik in the title role, with Cheyenne Jackson, Kyla Pratt, Julian Gant, Leslie Jordan, and Swoosie Kurtz in supporting roles.

The series premiered on Fox as a midseason entry in the 2020–21 television season on January 3, 2021. In May 2022, the series was renewed for a third season which premiered on September 29, 2022.

Premise 
Call Me Kat follows a 39-year-old single woman named Kat, "who struggles every day against society and her mother to prove that you cannot have everything you want – and still be happy". After leaving her job as a professor at the University of Louisville, she spends the money her parents set aside for her wedding to open a cat café in Louisville.

Cast

Main 

 Mayim Bialik as Kat, a 39-year old single woman who runs a cat café in Louisville and struggles to find a balance between her fulfilling new career and her constant sense of loneliness
 Swoosie Kurtz as Sheila, Kat's overbearing mother who cannot understand why her daughter chooses to be single and constantly tries to get her to meet new men
 Leslie Jordan as Phil, a newly single gay man who works as the head baker at Kat's café. It was later revealed that he was actually named Philliam. As stated, his name was supposed to be William but his father was really drunk when he named him.  After Jordan's death during production of season three, Phil was written out of the show by marrying Jalen and moving to Tahiti with him. 
 Kyla Pratt as Randi, a waitress at the café who becomes Kat's business partner in the third season
 Julian Gant as Carter, the owner of The Middle C, a piano bar next to Kat's café, and Randi's boyfriend (fiancé season 3)
 Cheyenne Jackson as Max, Kat's friend and former college love interest who works at Carter's bar after returning home from years of traveling abroad (Kat's boyfriend season 3)
 Christopher Rivas as Oscar (season 2; recurring season 1), a package delivery man and briefly Kat's fiancé

Recurring 

 Tim Bagley as Wyatt, a regular customer at Kat's café
 Lamorne Morris as Daniel (season 1), a customer at Kat's café who refuses to tip on social and political grounds and also had a relationship with Randi
 Vanessa Lachey as Tara Barnett (season 1), Kat's best friend since childhood who is married with three kids
 Schuyler Helford as Brigitte (season 1, guest season 3), Max's ex-girlfriend
 Andy Favreau as Nick (season 2), owner of a sandwich shop near Kat's café who becomes Kat's landlord
 Laura Bell Bundy as Nicole (season 2), Max's girlfriend
 John Griffin as Jalen/Queen Dicktoria (season 3), a drag performer and Phil's love interest
 Jack McBrayer as Gideon (season 3), an Amish baker that Kat hires to replace Phil

Guests
 Joey Lawrence as himself ("Call Me Kerfuffled")
 Jenna von Oÿ as herself ("Call Me Kerfuffled")
 Michael Stoyanov as himself ("Call Me Kerfuffled")
 Robin Thicke as himself ("Call Me Flatch")
 Chelsea Holmes as Kelly Mallet ("Call Me Flatch")
 Sam Straley as Lloyd "Shrub" Mallet ("Call Me Flatch")
 Ted Wass as Harley, Kat's deceased father ("Call Me Shellfish", "Call Me Dame Booty Clench")
 Ken Jennings as himself ("Call Me Ken Jennings")
 Parker Young as Donor 457/Brian ("Call Me Donor Four-Five-Seven")
 Kevin Sussman as Zac ("Call Me Donor Four-Five-Seven", "Call Me Chrismukkah")
 George Takei as himself ("Call Me Chrismukkah")
 Vicki Lawrence as Lurlene 'Mama' Crumpler, Phil's mother who shows up at Kat's café to replace him as a baker while he is out of town ("Call Me Philliam")
 Dolly Parton as herself pre-recorded ("Call Me Philliam")

Episodes

Series overview

Season 1 (2021)

Season 2 (2022)

Season 3 (2022–23)

Production

Development
On September 19, 2019, it was announced that Fox had given a series commitment, based on the British sitcom Miranda by Miranda Hart. The working title at this stage was Carla. The series was to be executive produced by Mayim Bialik and Darlene Hunt through Sad Clown Productions, Jim Parsons (Bialik's former co-star on The Big Bang Theory) and Todd Spiewak through That's Wonderful Productions, and Angie Stephenson and the original series creator and star Miranda Hart through BBC Studios. That's Wonderful Productions' Eric Norsoph, and Sad Clown Productions' Mackenzie Gabriel-Vaught would serve as producers. Production companies named were Fox Entertainment and Warner Bros. Television. On February 12, 2020, it was announced that the series title had been changed from Carla to Call Me Kat. On May 11, 2020, it was announced that Fox had ordered the pilot to series. The series premiered on January 3, 2021. On May 10, 2021, Fox renewed the series for a second season. On June 16, 2021, Alissa Neubauer joined the series as the showrunner for the second season to replace Hunt. On May 16, 2022, Fox renewed the series for a third season. On June 9, 2022, Jim Patterson and Maria Ferrari were announced as the new showrunners for the third season, replacing Neubauer.

During the show's development, Hunt decided to set the show in Louisville, near her hometown of Lebanon Junction, Kentucky, telling Kirby Yates of Louisville's daily newspaper, The Courier-Journal, "Louisville just felt right." In the same interview, Hunt told Yates that Bialik approved of the setting: "She had been to Louisville recently and loved the city and told me she felt it was really unique and special. I gave her the option to set it in her hometown of San Diego, but she doubled down on Louisville." Hunt is not the only Louisville-area native involved in the series' production; a co-executive producer and writer, Amy Hubbs, is from Elizabethtown, Kentucky. Hunt noted that she and Hubbs had "a big debate" over Kat's allegiance in the Kentucky–Louisville college rivalry, noting that "I grew up a big U of L fan, and Amy was a huge UK fan." Hunt chose not to reveal Kat's allegiance before the series premiere, but confirmed that the chosen university sent several items to be used in decorating the character's home.

According to Yates, the series is "chock full of Louisville references", with the first three episodes alone making multiple references to Louisville cultural touchstones and locations such as the UK–U of L rivalry, bourbon, the Brown Hotel, Churchill Downs, and Muhammad Ali. Yates added, "Although none of the show is actually filmed in Louisville, the show's art department works off photographs to recreate the references in Louisville on a production stage in Los Angeles." Hunt further added, "It does feel really special to be able to make so many shoutouts to people, places and things around Louisville and to be able to honor them in the show. A new hometown pride is coming out in me, so it's very special."

Bialik confirmed that the show is filmed on a closed set without a studio audience due to COVID-19; a laugh track is added during post-production. Tapings with a live studio audience began with the second season.

Casting
Upon series commitment, Bialik was also cast to star in the series. In February 2020, Swoosie Kurtz and Kyla Pratt had joined the cast in starring roles. On March 6, 2020, Cheyenne Jackson was cast in a starring role. On April 2, 2020, it was announced that Leslie Jordan joined the main cast. On April 28, 2020, it was reported that Julian Gant joined the cast as a series regular. In April 2022, it was reported Ted Wass and Bialik, who both starred in the sitcom Blossom as father-and-daughter, would reunite in the second season's finale, playing father-and-daughter.

Hunt added local color in casting of minor roles. She told Yates, "I cast one woman who mentioned she was from Louisville when she auditioned because her character works at a hotel, and I needed her to say 'Welcome to Louisville!' Anyone from Louisville knows how hard it is to get people from somewhere else to say that correctly!" The woman cast for that role grew up near Seneca Park in Louisville.

On October 24, 2022, Leslie Jordan was killed in a car crash, and it was announced that production on the series had paused indefinitely in the wake of his death. Jordan had completed work on eight episodes of season three prior to his death, but did not complete his work on the ninth episode. The October 27 episode "Call Me Uncle Dad" included a tribute to him.

Animal safety 
In an interview, Bialik said the cats used in filming are neither drugged nor tethered. Several trainers are on-set to supervise the cats.

Broadcast
Call Me Kat premiered on January 3, 2021, at 8/7c on Fox. On January 7, 2021, the series moved to Thursdays at 9/8c, its regular Thursday timeslot, alongside Last Man Standing. It can also be seen on CTV in Canada. The second season premiered on January 9, 2022. The third season premiered on September 29, 2022.

Reception

Critical response
The first season has received mostly negative reviews from critics. On Rotten Tomatoes, it holds an approval rating of 27% based on 15 critic reviews, with an average rating of 5.1/10. The website's critical consensus reads, "More gimmick than sitcom, Call Me Kat buries a charming Mayim Bialik in a sandbox of toothless jokes and shallow characterizations." On Metacritic, season one has a weighted average score of 41 out of 100, based on 10 critics, indicating "mixed or average reviews".

Ratings

Season 1

Season 2

Season 3

Accolades 
The series was nominated for Outstanding Cinematography For A Multi-Camera Series at the 73rd Primetime Emmy Awards. and for Outstanding Multi-Camera Picture Editing for a Comedy Series at the 74th Primetime Emmy Awards

Notes

References

External links
 
 Production website
 

2020s American sitcoms
2020s American workplace comedy television series
2021 American television series debuts
American television series based on British television series
English-language television shows
Fox Broadcasting Company original programming
Metafictional television series
Television series about cats
Television series by BBC Studios
Television series by Fox Entertainment
Television series by Warner Bros. Television Studios
Television series set in restaurants
Television shows set in Kentucky
American LGBT-related sitcoms